Wayne Anthony Norman Talkes (2 June 1952 – 17 April 2021) was an English professional footballer who played as a midfielder.

Career
Born in Ealing, Talkes was raised on the Isle of Wight and signed for Southampton in 1967. He made his Reserves debut later that year, becoming the youngest post-war debutant for the Reserves, but did not make his senior debut until the last game of the 1971–72 season. He also played in the Football League for Doncaster Rovers and Bournemouth. He later played in non-league with AFC Totton, Brockenhurst, Basingstoke Town, Midanbury and AC Delco, working for the Post Office and later in marketing, sales, and accounts management.

He died on 17 April 2021, aged 68, leaving behind a wife and two children.

References

1952 births
2021 deaths
English footballers
Southampton F.C. players
Doncaster Rovers F.C. players
AFC Bournemouth players
A.F.C. Totton players
Brockenhurst F.C. players
Basingstoke Town F.C. players
English Football League players
Association football midfielders
People from Ealing